Streetwalkers were an English rock band formed in late 1973 by two former members of rock band Family, vocalist Roger Chapman and guitarist John "Charlie" Whitney. They were a five piece band which evolved from the Chapman Whitney Band.

The band was managed by Michael Alphandary and Harvey Goldsmith and were best known for their live performances and their album Red Card (1976). By 1977 their potential to become more important in UK rock history was diminished by changing musical taste, due to the growing influence of punk rock and new wave music on European culture. The band had success in the United States and Europe, particularly Germany.

History

1973 Chapman Whitney Streetwalkers the album 

Chapman and Whitney signed to the Reprise label in 1973 and recorded Chapman Whitney Streetwalkers (1974) with a lineup including other members of Family (co-founder Ric Grech on bass, former bassists John Wetton and Jim Cregan providing bass and backing vocals and backing vocals respectively) and King Crimson (Wetton, plus saxophonist Mel Collins and drummers Ian Wallace and Michael Giles). When writing about the album for Allmusic, Patrick Little commented: During this period keyboard player Blue Weaver appeared with them at concerts, such as the Reading Festival in the summer of 1974. Bobby Tench from the Jeff Beck Group and Hummingbird was also featured in their fluid, informal touring band line up and appeared at concerts such as in Hyde Park, London, the same year

Concert billing, Rockpalast, Streetwalkers formation and Downtown Flyers 
After recording the album Chapman Whitney Streetwalkers, Chapman and Whitney changed the name of their band to Streetwalkers and Tench joined them as an official band member, when they signed to Phonogram Inc. in 1975. Tench was joined by drummer Nicko McBrain (who would later join Iron Maiden) and bass player Jon Plotel. They had previously appeared on a European broadcast for the German TV show Rockpalast with Chapman and Whitney earlier the same year, billed as the Chapman Whitney Streetwalkers. The band's first album, Downtown Flyers (1975) was released in both USA and Europe but did not achieve the anticipated success in USA, although interest in Europe was more encouraging.

Red Card, stadium concerts 
Their second studio album, the groove heavy album Red Card (1976) reached #16 in UK album charts and remains a much respected album. The band performed at a series of concerts entitled Who Put the Boot In appearing at UK Football stadiums, during May and June 1976, supporting the Who. The billing for these concerts included the Sensational Alex Harvey Band, Little Feat, Outlaws, Widowmaker (UK) and Streetwalkers were the second act to appear. The band also toured the U.S as support to others such as Wings, 10cc and Joe Cocker.

John Peel sessions, final Rockpalast appearance 
On 12 June 1976 they made their first appearance for John Peel on his "Peel Sessions" recorded by BBC radio, with the line-up of Chapman, Whitney, Tench, Plotel and McBrain and were featured by Peel once more as a "Peel session", on 14 March 1977. On 19 April the same year, they made their final appearance on Rockpalast, with a line-up which included Chapman, Whitney, Tench, keyboardist Brian Johnston, bassist Mickey Feat and drummer David Dowle who later joined Whitesnake.

Vicious But Fair and breakup of band 
By the time their third and final studio album Vicious But Fair (1977) was released, Vertigo had shifted their commercial emphasis to the musical trends of punk rock and new wave music.  The euphoria surrounding the band began to diminish and the potential of becoming more established in Europe evaporated. Streetwalkers Live (1977) was their final album and included a rough and ready compilation of poorly recorded tracks, probably released to comply with contractual obligations. In his review of this album for Allmusic, John Dougan mentions the poor quality of the recording and states that: "Chapman tears off a few soulful moments and it can rock". By now the band had broken up and Tench moved on to work with Van Morrisson, along with Feat.

Band members

Chapman Whitney Streetwalkers musicians 1973-1974 
Roger Chapman - harmonica, percussion and vocals
Boz Burrell - vocals
Jim Cregan - vocals
Linda Lewis - background vocals
Charlie Whitney - guitar and steel guitar
Neil Hubbard - guitar
Bobby Tench - guitar, vocals, percussion, keyboards
Ric Grech - bass
John Wetton - bass and vocals
Blue Weaver - keyboards
Tim Hinkley - keyboards and vocals
Max Middleton - keyboards
Mel Collins - saxophone, clarinet, bass clarinet
Michael Giles - drums
Ian Wallace - drums
Poli Palmer - vibraphone and background vocals
Godfrey McLean - percussion

Streetwalkers musicians 1975-1977 
Roger Chapman - harmonica, percussion and vocals
Charlie Whitney - guitar, keyboards, slide guitar
Bobby Tench - guitar, vocals, percussion, keyboards
 Jon Plotel - bass and background vocals
 Mickey Feat - bass
Brian Johnston - keyboards
Nicko McBrain - percussion and drums
David Dowle - drums

Albums 
 Chapman Whitney Streetwalkers Reprise K 54017UK/Mercury USA (May 1974)<
 Downtown Flyers Vertigo 6360 123 (October 1975)
 Red Card Vertigo 9102 010 UK/Mercury USA (May 1976). Reached #16 in UK album chart
 In Concert BBC (1975)
 Vicious But Fair Vertigo 9102 012UK/Mercury USA (January 1977)
 Live Streetwalkers Vertigo 6641 703 (December 1977)
 Best of Streetwalkers Vertigo 846 661 2(1991)

Re-issues 
 Red Card Repertoire REP 4147-WP CD (2002)
 Downtown Flyers BGO (2002)
 Vicious but Fair See for Miles SEECD 352(1994)
 Live at the BBC  Windsong 61 (1994)
 Streetwalkers Live BGO (2004)

Compilations 
 Red Card/Vicious but Fair BGO BGOCD 606 (2005)

Singles 
 "Roxianna"/"Crack" Reprise K14357 (1974) taken from Chapman-Whitney Streetwalkers album
 "Raingame"/"Miller" Vertigo 6059 130 (1975) taken from Downtown Flyers album
 "Daddy Rolling Stone"/"Hole In Your Pocket" Vertigo 6059 144 (1976) taken from Red Card album
 "Chilli Con Carne"/"But You're Beautiful" Vertigo Europe from Vicious but Fair album

Notes

References
Joynson, Vernon. The Tapestry of Delights - The Comprehensive Guide to British Music of the Beat, R&B, Psychedelic and Progressive Eras 1963-1976. Borderline (2006). Reprinted 2008. 
Roberts, David. British Hit Singles & Albums (19th edition). London: Guinness World Records Limited(2006). .

External links
Chapman Whitney Streetwalkers and Streetwalkers at Rockpalast WDR Studio-L Köln 1975 and 1977
[ Streetwalkers] discography at Allmusic
Streetwalkers Crawfish. Live at Rockpalast March 25, 1975 at NME.com

English rock music groups
Vertigo Records artists
Mercury Records artists
Reprise Records artists